Ellen Street railway station was the second of six stations that operated successively between 1875 and the early 2010s to serve the rural maritime town (later city) of Port Pirie, 216 km (134 mi) by rail north of Adelaide, South Australia. Soon after construction of the line towards Gladstone began in 1875, an impromptu passenger service commenced. Since two tracks had already been laid down the middle of Ellen Street to the wharves, a small corrugated iron  shed was erected as a ticket and parcels office. The street-side location was unusual for the South Australian Railways. In 1902, when passenger traffic had increased greatly, a stone building was erected in a striking Victorian Pavilion style. After the tracks were removed in 1967 and the station closed, the building's design assured its retention as a museum of the National Trust of South Australia.

Placement

Some time after the South Australian Railways commenced building a narrow-gauge (1067 mm / 3 ft 6 in) line inland from Port Pirie in 1875, track was extended about 900 metres (985 yards) from where the line had ended, the town's wharves. Two-thirds of this track was laid in Ellen Street, Port Pirie's main thoroughfare; the 30.5 metre (100 foot) width of the street provided ample room to lay a pair of tracks down the middle. For the first 13 years the line carried agricultural produce from the hinterland to the wharves for export – the purpose for which the government had built it. However, after 1888 the line also moved large amounts of silver-lead-zinc ore to Port Pirie from the New South Wales border near Broken Hill, 351 km (218 mi) away. Since the smelters had been built next to the northern end of the wharves, Ellen Street saw most of the inwards freight tonnage for Port Pirie, and sulphuric acid (a by-product sold to a fertiliser factory) outwards.

It was into this busy scene that the SAR decided, in late 1900, to introduce an on-street station for passenger services 400 metres (440 yards) short of the smelter gates. Tenders were called in June 1901 but offers were considered too high, so government employees built it. The keys were handed over without ceremony on 4 November 1902. The cost was £3760.

Construction
The station comprised a single-storey building, with a full-length veranda over the footpath, and a smaller building behind. There was none of the infrastructure usually present around stations, since there was no railway yard, only the double tracks going past. The design was in a striking Victorian Pavilion style, uniquely among South Australian Railways buildings. Its structure was stone with some brick, with a facade largely finished with pressed steel panels. The roof was corrugated iron; three domes were finished in large zinc shingles. Stairs were built in the central dome to allow the clocktower above it to be used as a lookout.

Operation

As a terminus for passenger trains on a through route to the nearby smelters, the station lacked a turning facility for locomotives. In the days of the narrow gauge, the double track provided a loop allowing locomotives to run around the train to re-couple and haul it back. In 1937, one of the two narrow-gauge tracks in Ellen Street was modified to dual gauge for broad-gauge trains connecting with Adelaide on a new, much more direct route via a line from Redhill.

Pressure to close
As motor vehicle traffic increased, freight and passenger trains were increasingly regarded as a hindrance in Ellen Street. In 1943, the Port Pirie Council urged the SAR to build a terminal passenger station at Mary Elie Street and remove all trains from Ellen street. The bid was unsuccessful; however, a councillor observed that the solution "did not seem a practical scheme in wartime, but it must be kept alive". In the meantime the council asked the railways to provide a safer area to the north of the station by bituminising between the rails and installing lights: since the brake van – the last vehicle – was positioned in front of the station to allow passengers to retrieve their baggage and other people to collect parcels in the least possible time, passengers from the front (northernmost) carriages had to climb down to street level well beyond from the station building on to a poorly lit surface.

Closure

Like four of Port Pirie's six railway stations, Ellen Street was superseded as a consequence of lines being constructed to wider gauges eventually entering the city. From 1970, when a standard-gauge line from Sydney via Broken Hill would be completed, a 213-metre (700-foot) platform would be necessary to provide for passengers on far longer trains to transfer across between broad and standard gauge. Unlike the arrival of the broad gauge in 1937, which was solved by adding a third rail down the street, this time a completely new station would be needed. In November 1967, a new station was opened in Mary Elie Street and Ellen Street station was closed – 24 years after the Port Pirie Council had requested it.

After the standard gauge arrived and narrow-gauge operations ceased, all tracks in Ellen Street tracks were pulled up. Since the smelters beyond the station still had to be supplied with ore from Broken Hill, new standard gauge tracks paralleling the street were laid along the narrow corridor between the station building and the wharves.

Museum
Externally unaltered since its erection in 1902, the building retains its prominent place in Port Pirie as a National Trust of South Australia museum,  years since it closed as a station.

Th building was listed on the National Trust of South Australia's Register of Historic Places in 1977, the now-defunct Register of the National Estate in 1978 and the South Australian Heritage Register in 1981.

Preceding station:  Inaugural Port Pirie station, located at Port Pirie South.

Concurrent stations: Solomontown and Port Pirie Junction.

Subsequent station: Mary Elie Street.

Gallery

See also
South Australian Railways
Rail transport in South Australia

Notes

References

Port Pirie
Disused railway stations in South Australia
Railway stations in Australia opened in 1902
Railway stations closed in 1967
South Australian Heritage Register
South Australian places listed on the defunct Register of the National Estate
Buildings and structures in Port Pirie